Habrosia is a genus of flowering plants belonging to the family Caryophyllaceae.

Its native range is Western Asia.

Species:
 Habrosia spinuliflora (Ser.) Fenzl

References

Caryophyllaceae
Caryophyllaceae genera